EAC-C2C is a submarine telecommunications cable system interconnecting several countries in Asia, the Pacific, and the United States. It is a merger of the former EAC (East Asia Crossing) and C2C cable systems. The merger occurred in 2007 by Asia Netcom, and the cable system is now owned/operated by Pacnet.
Pacnet was acquired by the Australian telecommunications company Telstra in 2015.

The EAC portion of the cable system includes:

Landing points:

 Changi, Singapore
 Tseung Kwan O, Hong Kong
 Qingdao, China (later extension)
 Bali, Taiwan
 Capepisa, The Philippines
 Taean, South Korea
 Shima, Japan
 Ajigaura, Hitachinaka, Ibaraki, Japan

Length: 19,500 kilometers

Capacity: 160 Gbit/s - upgradeable to 2.5 Tbit/s

Technology: DWDM (dense wavelength-division multiplex)

The C2C portion of the cable system comprises three rings:

C2C North Ring
C2C South Ring

The landing points on each ring are as follows:

C2C North Ring

Chung Hom Kok, Southern District, Hong Kong
Nasugbu, Batangas Province, Philippines
Fangshan, Pingtung County, Taiwan
Danshui District, New Taipei City, Taiwan
Nanhui District, Shanghai, China
Pusan, South Korea
Shima, Mie Prefecture, Japan
Chikura, Chiba, Chiba Prefecture, Japan

C2C South Ring

Hong Kong
Nasugbu, Batangas Province, Philippines
Vung Tau, Bà Rịa–Vũng Tàu province, Vietnam
Changi, Singapore

EAC-C2C Merger
In 2007, Asia Netcom (now Pacnet) merged the EAC cable system and the C2C cable system into a single EAC-C2C cable system, spanning 36,800 kilometers between Japan, Korea, China, Taiwan, Hong Kong, the Philippines and Singapore, connecting 17 cable landing stations. EAC-C2C cable system becomes the most resilient submarine network in Asia region.

References

External links
 Pacnet
 Map of EAC
 nec.com

Submarine communications cables in the Pacific Ocean